Blue1 Oy was a Finnish airline owned by CityJet. It was a subsidiary of the SAS Group and flew to around 28 destinations in Europe, mainly from its base at Helsinki Airport. It carried over 1.7 million passengers in 2011. The airline was a member of Star Alliance and had its head office in Vantaa.

History

Early years
The airline was established in 1987 and started operations in 1988 as Air Botnia, flying Embraer EMB-110 Bandeirantes on night cargo flights and on passenger services from Helsinki to Kauhajoki and Seinäjoki. It started to supplement its unpressurised Bandeirantes with leased British Aerospace Jetstream 31s in 1993, but cash flow problems in the summer of 1995 caused British Aerospace to repossess the Jetstreams and brought Air Botnia to the point of bankruptcy, but it continued operations in a reduced scale.

The airline was purchased by SAS Group in January 1998, who replaced its Jetstreams with Saab 340s later that year. Air Botnia received its first jets, Fokker F28 Fellowships, in 1999. The elderly F28s were soon replaced as their high noise levels restricted operations, with Avro RJ85s being received in 2001. The Saab 340s were replaced by larger Saab 2000s at the same time.

Development since 2004
Air Botnia was renamed Blue1 in January 2004, and joined Star Alliance as its first regional member on 3 November 2004. Blue1 became a full member of Star Alliance on 1 January 2009. Blue1 left Star Alliance in November 2012 and became an affiliate of Scandinavian Airlines.

In 2005 Blue1 became the second-largest Finnish airline with more than 100 daily flights and the biggest operator between Finland and Scandinavia. In 2006 Blue1 started 10 new non-stop routes to Europe increasing its total capacity by more than 50%. In 2008 Blue1 moved its London operations from Stansted to Heathrow Airport, and expanded its domestic business routes. In 2009 new routes to Lapland, including Paris-Kittilä were opened for the winter season and routes to Biarritz, Dubrovnik and Split for summer travel.

Blue1 was the first network airline in Northern Europe to be granted ISO 14001 environmental certificate. On 1 November 2012, Blue1 became a service producer for SAS. This means that marketing and sales were then handled by SAS (meaning that marketing and sales were handled by SAS and its flights carried the SAS flight prefix "SK").

In March 2015, it was announced that Blue1 was to sell their entire fleet of Boeing 717-200s to Volotea and Delta Air Lines and was to replace them with Boeing 737-600s from its parent, Scandinavian Airlines, however Scandinavian Airlines later cancelled the plan and considered to transfer some Bombardier CRJ900 from Cimber.

In October 2015, Scandinavian Airlines (SAS) announced the sale of Blue1 to CityJet, which was to operate the company on behalf of SAS as part of a larger relationship. In December 2015, Blue1 did not operate any aircraft and its own website has been redirected to SAS's website. In 2016, Blue1 was dissolved and merged into its new parent CityJet.

Destinations

Fleet

Last fleet
As of December 2015 - before its actual dissolution - Blue1 did not operate any aircraft as the Boeing 717-200s previously operated had been phased out without replacement.

Retired fleet
Previously Blue1 also operated the following aircraft types:

Onboard services
Blue1 offered two service classes, Economy and Economy Extra (previously Blue1 Premium).

Economy Class: Coffee and tea were included on all Blue1 operated flights. Sandwiches and other drinks were available for purchase from "Cafe1". Flights with short flight time had reduced service.
Economy Extra: Fast Track security and Business Class check-in was included where available.

References

Citations

Bibliography
 Pagiola, Stefano. (October 2004) "Stars in Their Eyes: Finland's Blue 1 Regional Airline". Air International, Vol 67 No 4. pp. 42–45.

External links

Defunct airlines of Finland
European Regions Airline Association
Airlines established in 2004
Airlines disestablished in 2016
SAS Group members
Former Star Alliance affiliate members
Former Star Alliance members
Finnish companies established in 2004